The Texas–Rio Grande Valley Vaqueros men's soccer program represents the University of Texas Rio Grande Valley in all NCAA Division I men's college soccer competitions. Founded in 1987, and relaunched in 2015, the Vaqueros compete as associate members in the Western Athletic Conference. They are coached by Bryheem Hancock .
Vaqueros plays their home matches at the UTRGV Soccer and Track & Field Complex.

History

Coaching records

Seasons

Rivalries 
UTRGV's two primary rivals are the in-state rivals of the WAC, Houston Baptist and Incarnate Wood.

 Houston Baptist — Series tied 6–6–0
 Incarnate Word — UTRGV leads 5–4–1

References

External links 
 

 
1987 establishments in Texas
1997 disestablishments in Texas
Association football clubs established in 1987